Inspector de Luca is an Italian television series produced and broadcast by RAI, based on the De Luca trilogy (1990-1996) of detective novels by Carlo Lucarelli. The 
USA DVD box title is Detective De Luca with the tag line, "He's not a fascist/ He's not a partisan/ He's just a cop."

Concept and scope
Covering the period from 1938 to 1948 in Bologna, the series centers on Commissario Achille de Luca, and is set from the height of Fascist era in Italy to the immediate post-war period.

Dashing and attractive to women, De Luca is depicted as an honest cop, a determined and principled policeman working in a corrupt and politically charged environment. While concerned only with truth and justice but not for the bigger picture, he manages to avoid taking sides.

Production
The series comprises four episodes, three of which are based on novels by Lucarelli, while the first serves as an introduction to the character and the milieu. The series was directed by Antonio Frazzi, who also co-wrote the episodes with his brother, Andrea and with Lucarelli. The series was first screened on Italian television in 2008. It was shown in the UK on BBC Four in March and April 2014. It is available on DVD in Italian with English subtitles. The films are dedicated to Andrea (b. Florence, 1944 – d. Florence, 5 May 2006).

Characters
 Alessandro Preziosi: Insp. Achille De Luca, a police detective in northern Italy.(4 episodes)
 Corrado Fortuna: Sgt. Leopoldo Pugliesi, De Luca's assistant. (4 episodes)
 Rolando Raquello: Insp. Roberto Rosseta, a politically astute colleague of De Luca's. (3 episodes)
 Raffaela Rea: De Luca's lover. (2 episodes)
 Stefano Pesce: Guido Leonardi, head of Partisan police. (2 episodes)

Episodes

Notes

External links
 Inspector De Luca at IMDb
 Inspector De Luca at BBC

Italian crime television series
2008 Italian television series debuts
2000s Italian television series
RAI original programming